Pargasite is a complex inosilicate mineral of the amphibole group with formula NaCa2(Mg4Al)(Si6Al2)O22(OH)2.

It was first described for an occurrence in Pargas, Finland in 1814 and named for the locality.

It occurs in high temperature regional metamorphic rocks and in the skarns within contact aureoles around igneous intrusions. It also occurs in andesite volcanic rocks and altered ultramafic rocks.

This has significant consequences for the water storage capacity, and the solidus temperature of the lherzolite of the upper mantle.

It is used as a gemstone.

See also
Anyolite

References

 

Amphibole group
Monoclinic minerals
Minerals in space group 12
Gemstones